William C. Abbott was an American politician.

Abbot was born circa 1817, of English descent, and worked as a lawyer in Maryland. He later moved to Texas. After George Tyler Wood resigned the District 7 seat in the Texas Senate, Abbott was elected to office, but never took the seat during the First Texas Legislature. Abbott was sworn in on 14 December 1847 and remained in office until 5 November 1847. He died in Liberty, Texas, on 16 September 1863.

References

1810s births
1863 deaths
American people of English descent
19th-century American lawyers
Texas state senators
19th-century American politicians
Maryland lawyers
People from Liberty, Texas